Géza is a Hungarian given name and may refer to any of the following:

 Benjamin Géza Affleck
 Géza, Grand Prince of the Hungarians
 Géza I of Hungary, King of Hungary 
 Géza II of Hungary, King of Hungary
 Géza, son of Géza II of Hungary
 Geza de Kaplany
 Géza Maróczy
 Geza Šifliš
 Geza von Hoffmann
 Géza Wertheim
 Geza X

Hungarian masculine given names